The People's Reconstruction Party (PPR) is a political party of Argentina with a nationalist ideology. It was founded in 1996 by Gustavo Breide Obeid, Francisco Miguel Bosch and Enrique Graci Susini. Colonel Mohamed Alí Seineldín were also a leader of the group at one time.

Its national president is the licentiate in Political Science by the University J.F. Kennedy, and ex Army captain Gustavo Breide Obeid.

Its youth organization is the National Youth of the PPR.

Ideology 
It defines itself as a party founded to "initiate a process of national reconstruction of salvation of the Argentine  homeland". It opposes globalization and the new world order, fostering the restoration of what it calls the traditional values that enabled the birth of the nation, recovering social justice, political sovereignty and economic independence.  Its ideological positioning is based on Catholic nationalism, expressed with the defense of what it considers "the fundamental pillars of the Argentine National Being (Argentinity): God, Homeland and Family". Because of the values it defends, it can also be considered an ideology close to conservatism and the extreme right.  It defines itself as contrary to the neo-liberal economic system.

It affirms that it is necessary to give parliamentary treatment to the investigation of the external debt, and is in favor of suspending the payment until the investigation is finished. It opposes abortion because of its understanding that human life begins from conception. It emphasizes the values of masculinity and  femininity and considers homosexuality as a "deviation", positioning itself against civil unions between people of the same sex.

It proposes the restoration of compulsory military service, the elevation of the retirement age to 70 years for men and the maintenance of religious education in primary and secondary schools.

Electoral results 

Presidential elections 2007 – 45,318 votes (0.24%).

Presidential elections 2003 – 42,460 votes (0.22%).

References 

 Foundational Act of the Popular Reconstruction Party

External links
Official web site of the Popular Reconstruction Party
Official facebook profile of the Popular Reconstruction Party

Far-right politics in Argentina
Nationalist parties in South America
Conservative parties in Argentina
Argentine nationalism